The 2022 Florida Gators baseball team represented the University of Florida in the sport of baseball during the 2022 college baseball season. Florida competed in the Eastern Division of the Southeastern Conference (SEC). Home games were played at Condron Ballpark on the university's Gainesville, Florida, campus, in the second season at the ballpark. The team was coached by Kevin O'Sullivan in his fifteenth season as Florida's head coach. The Gators entered the season looking to return to the College World Series after an early regional exit from the 2021 NCAA Tournament.

Previous season
The 2021 Gators entered the season as the unanimous No. 1 team, but stumbled to a 17–13 SEC record to enter the SEC Tournament as the sixth seed, where they made the semifinals before being eliminated by eventual tournament runner-up Tennessee. The Gators were then selected to host a regional in the 2021 NCAA Division I baseball tournament in the Austin Super Regional, but were eliminated in only two games, suffering a 19–1 loss to South Alabama, who scored 10 runs with two outs in the sixth inning.

Personnel

Coaching staff

Schedule

Schedule Source:
*Rankings are based on the team's current ranking in the D1Baseball poll. Parentheses indicate tournament seedings.

Standings

Results

Rankings

Notes

References

Florida
Florida Gators baseball seasons
Florida Gators baseball
Florida